Colin Barnes (born 28 May 1957) is an English former professional footballer born in Notting Hill, London, who played as a forward in the Football League for Torquay United.

Barnes began his career with Crystal Palace, but failed to make the grade at Selhurst Park and moved to Luton Town. He left Luton without making his first team debut and joined non-league Dunstable Town. He later played for Hitchin Town, Adelaide City and Barnet, where he was top scorer and Player of the Year in the 1982–83 season, and from where he  was signed by Torquay United in August 1983. His league debut came on 28 September 1983, Barnes scoring against Chester City in a Fourth Division match at Sealand Road.
Although a regular in the side, in 1984 he was allowed to leave for non-league Yeovil Town. He had played 43 league games for Torquay, scoring 11 times.

References

External links
 Colin Barnes at Aussie Footballers

1957 births
Living people
Footballers from Kensington
Association football forwards
English footballers
Luton Town F.C. players
Dunstable Town F.C. players
Hitchin Town F.C. players
Adelaide City FC players
Barnet F.C. players
Torquay United F.C. players
Yeovil Town F.C. players
English Football League players
National League (English football) players
National Soccer League (Australia) players
Footballers from Luton